The Fitzroy District Football Club, that was commonly & simply referred to as 'Fitzroy', was an Anglo-Celtic backed association football (soccer) club from Melbourne, Australia, presumably based in the inner-northern suburbs of Fitzroy & Fitzroy North. Founded no later than 26 September 1908 and dissolving at the conclusion of the 1913 season, the short lived club is known for being one of the six clubs to compete in the inaugural Victorian state tier one football league season of 1909, then known as the 'Amateur League'. Except for Williamstown, the five other clubs including Fitzroy all used Middle Park stadium in Albert Park as a home venue for the regular season and Dockerty Cup matches. The club's colors were dark blue and black for the 1909 season, and did not achieve any accolades throughout its existence.

References

Soccer clubs in Melbourne
Association football clubs established in 1908
1908 establishments in Australia
Victorian Premier League teams
1913 disestablishments in Australia
Association football clubs disestablished in 1913
Victorian State League teams
Defunct soccer clubs in Australia
Fitzroy, Victoria